Baker Hotel may refer to:

 Hotel Baker, St. Charles, Illinois
 Baker Hotel (Baker, Montana) in Fallon County
 Baker Hotel (Mineral Wells, Texas) in Palo Pinto County
 Baker Hotel (Baker City, Oregon), (originally Baker Community Hotel)
 Baker Hotel (Dallas), demolished in 1980 to make way for One Bell Plaza